The Acqua Tignese is a stream in the Haute-Corse department of the Corsica region that has its mouth north of Cap Corse, in the Ligurian Sea.

Geography

The source is 200 meters west of Monte di e Castelle ( high).

The river flows generally from the south to the north of Cap Corse.

It has its mouth on the Ligurian Sea between the municipalities of Ersa and Rogliano.
Its mouth is between the port of Barcaggio to the west and the beach of Cala to the east, opposite the island of Giraglia.

The neighboring rivers are to the south, the Luri.

Communes and cantons crossed

The Acqua Tignese crosses four communes in the Haute-Corse department.
From upstream to downstream they are Rogliano (source), Morsiglia, Centuri and Ersa (mouth).
The Acqua Tignese flows entirely within the former canton of Capobianco in the arrondissement of Bastia.

Watershed

Managing body

The managing body since the Corsican law of 22 January 2002 has been the Corsican Basin Committee (Comité de bassin de Corse).

Tributaries

The Acqua Tignese has no referenced tributaries.
The Strahler number is therefore one.

Hydrology

QIX 2 is 1.8 m3/s, QIX 5 is 3.6 m3/s, QIX 10 is 4.8 m3/s and QIX 20 is 5.9 m3/s.

The specific flow rate (Qsp) reaches 6.5 liters per second / per square kilometer of basin.

Human presence

Since 1979 there has been a project to build a dam on the Acqua Tignese.

The hydraulic problems of the municipalities of the northern part of Cap Corse being more and more worrying, on 21 July 1988, the Corsican Assembly adopted the motion relating to the construction of the Acqua Tignese dam.
The Acqua Tignese, "an undisturbed Mediterranean river (the Corsican brook salamander lives in the Acqua Tignese, would this be the case if the dam had been built?)".

A footbridge crosses the river built about fifty meters from its mouth and is used by hikers along the sentier des douaniers and visitors going to the beach of Cala.

Ecology

The Pointe du Cap Corse site of the Conservatoire du littoral, managed by the Association Finocchiarola-Pointe du Cap Corse, adjoins a good part of the lower course of the Acqua Tignese, especially near its mouth.

Fauna

The stagnant, brackish and salty waters of the stream near its mouth are home to many protected animal species, amphibians from the anuran (without a tail) and urodela (with tail) groups: the Corsican fire salamander (Salamandra corsica) marginally present on the coast, and the Corsican brook salamander (Euproctus montanus) which are endemic, the Tyrrhenian painted frog (Discoglossus sardus)  and the Sardinian tree frog (Hyla sarda) endemic to Corsica, Sardinia, Capraia and Elbe, the Italian pool frog (Pelophylax bergeri) which is expanding from the Pointe du Cap estuarine marshes into the upper course of the streams, finally the European green toad (Bufotes viridis) of the West Mediterranean which lives mainly on the coast, in the marshes and puddles of back dunes.

The Corsican euprocte lives in Acqua Tignese where adults and larvae take refuge in the basins during the dry season.

Flora
Some twenty-one rare threatened or endemic plants are present in the lagoon of Barcaggio and at the mouth of Acqua Tignese:
Lippia nodiflora: a single locality in France, the Barcaggio lagoon
Cressa cretica very threatened in mainland France, vulnerable in Corsica: lagoon of Barcaggio
Vitex agnus-castus or the chaste tree grows at the mouths of streams. It is in sharp decline in mainland France. The mouth of Acqua Tignese is one of the 3 most beautiful settlements on the island

Notes

Sources

Rivers of Haute-Corse
Rivers of France
Coastal basins of the Mediterranean Sea in Corsica